Pavlikeni Point (Nos Pavlikeni \'nos pa-vli-'ke-ni\) projects 600 m from the north coast of Greenwich Island in the South Shetland Islands, Antarctica and is snow-free in summer.  It is named after the Bulgarian town of Pavlikeni.

Location

Pavlikeni Point in fiction
Pavlikeni Point features in the recent book Pavlikeni Point: Short Stories by the Bulgarian writer Dimitar Tomov.

Maps
 L.L. Ivanov. Antarctica: Livingston Island and Greenwich, Robert, Snow and Smith Islands. Scale 1:120000 topographic map.  Troyan: Manfred Wörner Foundation, 2009.

Notes

References
 Pavlikeni Point. SCAR Composite Antarctic Gazetteer
 Bulgarian Antarctic Gazetteer. Antarctic Place-names Commission. (details in Bulgarian, basic data in English)

External links
 Pavlikeni Point. Copernix satellite image

Headlands of Greenwich Island